Endotricha whalleyi is a species of snout moth in the genus Endotricha. It is found in China (Tibet).

The wingspan is about 16 mm. The forewings are greyish brown, irrorated with black and wine reddish scales. The hindwings are concolorous to the forewings.

Etymology
The species is named after the late Paul E. S. Whalley for his contribution to the revision of the world Endotricha species.

References

Moths described in 2012
Endotrichini